Remus Cozma (born 12 November 1952) is a Romanian Olympic boxer. He represented his country in the light-flyweight division at the 1976 Summer Olympics. He lost his first match against Payao Poontarat. He also won one national senior title and one bronze medal at the European Amateur Boxing Championships.

References

External links

1952 births
Living people
Romanian male boxers
Olympic boxers of Romania
Boxers at the 1976 Summer Olympics
Light-flyweight boxers